Oleksandr Antonovich Ruzhytskyi (Ukrainian: Олександр Антонович Ружицький; Russian: Александр Антонович Ружицкий; 4 January 1938 – 18 January 2017) was a Ukrainian and formerly Soviet politician.

Early life and education 
Ruzhytskyi was born in the village of Malyshivka in Koziatyn Raion of Vinnytsia Oblast in the Soviet Union on January 4, 1938. He graduated from the Uman Agricultural Institute in 1960. From 1960 to 1961, he worked as the Chief Agronomist of the Zhovten Kolkhoz in Mykolaiv Oblast.

Political career 
Ruzhytskyi joined the Communist Party of the Soviet Union in 1961.

He served as the First Secretary of the Yelanets District Committee of the Komsomol of Ukraine from 1961 to 1962. He then served as the Deputy Head of a Kolkhoz in Nova Odessa Raion of Mykolaiv Oblast from 1962 to 1964. From 1964 to 1965, he was once again involved with the Komsomol of Ukraine. From 1965 to 1970, he served as the Second Secretary of the Nova Odessa District Committee of the Communist Party of the Soviet Union and was promoted to First Secretary of the Nova Odessa District Committee in 1970. He continued to work as the First Secretary of the district committee until 1975 when he became an Inspector of the Central Committee of the Communist Party of the Soviet Union. From November 4, 1982 to February 6, 1988, he worked as the Second Secretary of Khmelnitsky Regional Committee of the Communist Party of the Soviet Union. From September 1988 to August 1991, Ruzhytskyi served as the First Secretary of the Cherkasy Regional Committee of the Communist Party of the Soviet Union. From April 1990 to March 1991, he was the Chairman of the Cherkasy Regional Council of People's Deputies.

From 1991 to 1998, Ruzhytskyi served as the Head of the Department of Agriculture of Cherkasy Oblast.

Death 
Oleksandr Ruzhytskyi passed away in the city of Cherkasy, Ukraine on January 18, 2017.

Awards 

  Order of the Red Banner of Labour (twice)
  Order of the Badge of Honour (twice)
  Diploma of the Presidium of the Verkhovna Rada of the Ukrainian Soviet Socialist Republic (1987)
  Diploma of the Chairman of the Verkhovna Rada of Ukraine (2003)
  Medal "25 years of Independence of Ukraine" (2016)

See also 

 Kolkhoz
 Cherkasy

References 

1938 births
2017 deaths
Soviet politicians
Ukrainian politicians